Live at the El Mocambo may refer to:

 Live at the El Mocambo (Elvis Costello album), 1993
 Live at the El Mocambo (April Wine album), 1977
 Live at the El Mocambo (Stevie Ray Vaughan video), 1991
 El Mocambo 1977, by the Rolling Stones, also referred to as Live at the El Mocambo, 2022

See also